The Beautiful Guitar is a compilation album released by instrumental rock artist Joe Satriani in 1993. It was only released in Europe, and contained various softer, ballad-like songs (As opposed to more rock-oriented hits such as "Surfing with the Alien") from his six previous albums.

Track listing
All songs written by Joe Satriani, except where noted.
 "Cryin'" – 5:44
 "Always with Me, Always with You" – 3:24
 "Thinking of You" – 3:56
 "The Crush of Love" (Satriani, John Cuniberti) – 4:22
 "I Believe" – 5:54
 "Rubina" – 5:54
 "Tears in the Rain" – 1:18
 "All Alone" – 4:23
 "Why" – 4:46
 "Echo" – 5:39
 "Midnight" – 1:43
 "Rubina's Blue Sky Happiness" – 6:10
 "Day at the Beach" – 2:05
 "Saying Goodbye" – 2:51

Joe Satriani compilation albums
1993 compilation albums